Enrique Caballero Peraza was born in Acapulco, Guerrero, on October 27, 1959. He is a Mexican politician, physician and psychologist.

Family 
He is the youngest son of the politician Enrique Caballero Aburto (1905–1975) and of poet Yolanda Peraza Guzmán (1926–2006). As well, nephew of the ex-governor of Guerrero Raúl Caballero Aburto.

He is the father of Enrique Caballero Maldonado, born in 1985, son of Carolina Maldonado Arroyo (1956–2008) and of Daniela Caballero Sánchez de la Barquera, born in 1988, and of Alexander Caballero Sánchez de la Barquera, born in 1995, children of Cecilia Sánchez de la Barquera. (1962–2005).

The paternal family (Caballero-Aburto) descends from Luis Caballero Galán, the bastard son  of the controversial one Archbishop-Viceroy Antonio Caballero.

Political activities 

He was a member of the Mexican Congress (The Chamber of Deputies of México) in the parliamentary group of National Action Party in the federal congress, in the LV Legislature from 1991 to 1994, and in the Congress of Guerrero from 1996 to 1999. He also ran for mayor of the city of Acapulco in 1996.

Internally in National Action Party he was President of the Party in the State of Guerrero by a period of 6 years. (1990–1997), Member of the Council in the State and also National and member of the National Executive Committee that was chaired by Lic. Carlos Castillo Peraza (1993–1996).

Academic Degrees 

He made his professional studies in the Mexican Medicine Faculty of Universidad La Salle and in the Faculty of Psychology of National Autonomous University of Mexico. Their studies of postgraduate were made in the Mexican Association of Dynamic Psychotherapy. Later he did their studies in Theory and Political Analysis as well as Political Philosophy, were made respectively in the Institute of Legislative Investigations of the UNAM, and in the Foundation Antonio Gramsci, in coordination with the UNAM and Autonomous University of Guerrero.

Current Activities 

At the moment he is dedicated to his private practice and to teaching, even though it maintains entailment with the  National Action of Party, in the federal electoral process of 2006, he was  Operative Coordinator of Campaign in the presidential campaign of Felipe Calderón in the State of Oaxaca. In the federal electoral process of 2009 he was Operative Coordinator of Campaign, with National Action Party in Oaxaca.

References

External links
 Personal page on GeoCities

Mexican psychologists
1959 births
Politicians from Guerrero
People from Acapulco
Members of the Chamber of Deputies (Mexico)
National Action Party (Mexico) politicians
Living people
Members of the Congress of Guerrero
20th-century Mexican politicians